Bjurbäck Church is a church building in Mullsjö Municipality in Sweden, located on the northeastern shorelines of the Lake Näs. Belonging to the Mullsjö-Sandhem Parish of the Church of Sweden, it was inaugurated on 23 July 1899, replacing a 1732 church.

References

External links

19th-century Church of Sweden church buildings
Churches in Mullsjö Municipality
Churches completed in 1899
Churches in the Diocese of Skara